Dornes is a commune in the south of Nièvre department in central France.

See also
 Communes of the Nièvre department

References

External links

 Dornes Official website 

Communes of Nièvre